Nadja Breytenbach is a Namibian model and beauty pageant titleholder who was crowned the title of Miss Namibia 2019. She represented Namibia during Miss Universe 2019.

Pageantry
On 6 July 2019, Breytenbach first participated at Miss Namibia 2019 competition. She won the pageant which was held at Windhoek Country Club Resort and Casino in Windhoek. Her court included Julita-Kitwe Mbangula was chosen as the first runner-up while Johanna Swartbooi was selected the second runner-up. She was crowned by the outgoing titleholder Selma Kamanya, Miss Namibia 2018. As Miss Namibia, Breytenbach represented her country at Miss Universe 2019 pageant.

References

External links
missnamibia.com.na
missuniverse.com

1995 births
Living people
Namibian female models
Namibian beauty pageant winners
Miss Universe 2019 contestants
White Namibian people